Jack Bicknell (born February 20, 1938) is a retired American football coach, most recently known for his long involvement in NFL Europa and its predecessor, the World League of American Football (WLAF). He served as the head football coach at the University of Maine from 1976 to 1980 and at Boston College from 1981 to 1988, compiling a career college football record of 77–90–2. In 1984, Bicknell coached his Boston College Eagles team to a 10–2 mark including a victory in the Cotton Bowl Classic. His quarterback that season, Doug Flutie, was awarded the Heisman Trophy.

A native of North Plainfield, New Jersey, Bicknell played quarterback at North Plainfield High School, graduating in 1955 and earning a scholarship to attend Rutgers University.

Coaching career

College
Bicknell was the head football coach at the University of Maine from 1976 to 1980, earning an 18–35–1 record. After that, he went to coach at Boston College, where he stayed for ten years. At Boston College, he was 59–55–1, and was head coach in 1984 when Heisman Trophy-winner Doug Flutie completed his famous Hail Mary pass to Gerard Phelan to beat the Miami Hurricanes as time expired. Bicknell son, Jack Jr., was the center for BC at the time of Flutie's miracle pass.

NFL Europe
Bicknell was named the head coach of the Barcelona Dragons at their inception in 1991, and served there until October 2003, when he was named head coach of the Scottish Claymores. He has an overall record of 59–55 in his NFL Europe career. Bicknell made four World Bowl appearances, and had been to three title games in six years. In 1991, he led the Barcelona Dragons to an 8–2 mark and a berth in the first World Bowl. In 1997, his Dragons won the first half of the season and went on to win World Bowl '97 in Barcelona. In 1999, the Dragons posted a league-best 7–3 mark before losing to Frankfurt in the World Bowl. Also posted a league-best 8–2 record in 2001 before losing World Bowl IX to the Berlin Thunder in Amsterdam. On March 28, 2007, Bicknell stepped down as head coach of the Hamburg Sea Devils, citing health issues as the reason for his resignation.

Personal life
Bicknell is nicknamed "Cowboy Jack" because of his love for country music and horse riding. He and his wife, Lois, have three children, Jack, Jr., Wendy and Bob and five grandchildren. Both of his sons played for him at Boston College and are currently football coaches, Bob with the New Orleans Saints and Jack, Jr. with the North Carolina Tar Heels.

Head coaching record

College

Professional

References

1938 births
Living people
American football quarterbacks
Barcelona Dragons coaches
Boston College Eagles football coaches
Hamburg Sea Devils coaches
Maine Black Bears football coaches
Montclair State Red Hawks football players
Scottish Claymores coaches
High school football coaches in New Jersey
North Plainfield High School alumni
People from North Plainfield, New Jersey
Sportspeople from Somerset County, New Jersey
Coaches of American football from New Jersey
Players of American football from New Jersey
American expatriate sportspeople in Spain
American expatriate sportspeople in Germany
American expatriate sportspeople in Scotland